"Gift Shop" is a song by Canadian rock group The Tragically Hip. It was released in June 1996 as the second single from their fifth studio album, Trouble at the Henhouse. The song was a successful follow-up to the band's previous hit single "Ahead by a Century", peaking at No. 4 on Canada's RPM Singles Chart.

Music video
The music video for "Gift Shop" was directed by Eric Yealland and filmed in Sedona, Arizona in July 1996.

The video reached #1 on MuchMusic Countdown for the week of September 20, 1996. The video also won the award for "Best Cinematography" at the 1997 MuchMusic Video Awards.

Charts

Weekly charts

Year-end charts

References

External links

1996 singles
The Tragically Hip songs
1996 songs